The Baet-Ul-Ahad Mosque is a mosque in Delap-Uliga-Djarrit, Majuro, Marshall Islands.

History
The mosque was opened in 2012 as the first and only mosque in the country. The opening ceremony was attended by the members of Ahmadiyya Muslim community of the country.

Architecture
The mosque is a 2-story white building with blue roof and two minarets.

See also
 Islam in Marshall Islands

References

2012 establishments in the Marshall Islands
Ahmadiyya mosques
Islam in the Marshall Islands
Mosques completed in 2012
Mosques in Oceania
Majuro